Johnny Lockett (1915-2004) was a British professional Grand Prix motorcycle road racer who competed in the 1940s and 1950s.

He competed in the 1949 Grand Prix motorcycle racing season riding on a 500cc Norton bike and finished seventh overall with 13 points, 17 points behind fellow British rider and teammate Harold Daniell.

World Championship results 

(key) (Races in bold indicate pole position; races in italics indicate fastest lap.)

References

External links
Isle of Mann results
Race Database

British motorcycle racers
500cc World Championship riders
350cc World Championship riders
2004 deaths
1915 births